North Haven is a residential neighbourhood in the northwest quadrant of Calgary, Alberta. The community is split by a bus trap into "Lower North Haven" on the south side and "Upper North Haven" on the north side.

North Haven was established in 1963. Development of Lower North Haven took place between 1962 and 1971. The development of Upper North Haven started in 1977. Previously the land was primarily cattle grazing ranch land, part of the once vast grazing leases of the city's famed early ranchers, Pat Burns.  The community is represented in the Calgary City Council by the Ward 4 Councillor. The neighbourhood has a community association and a community hall to serve its residents.

North Haven is bordered on the west/northwest by Nose Hill Park and 14th Street NW, along the south/southeast by John Laurie Boulevard, which separates it from the neighbourhoods of Cambrian Heights and Highwood, and along the east/northeast by Egerts Park, which separates it from the neighbourhood of Thorncliffe.

Demographics

Residents in this community had a median household income of $56,142 in 2000 ($77,803 in UNH), and there were 10.8% low income residents living in the neighbourhood. As of 2000, 14.9% of the residents were immigrants. A proportion of 5.1% of the buildings were condominiums or apartments, and 24.5% of the housing was used for renting.

Education
The community is served by North Haven Elementary public school. The neighbourhood's designated public Junior High and High Schools are Colonel Irvine and John G. Diefenbaker Sr. High School for Upper North Haven Residents and James Fowler High School for lower North Haven residents respectively.

Notable residents
Todd McFarlane, a Canadian comic book artist, writer, toy manufacturer/designer, and media entrepreneur who is best known as the creator of the epic occult fantasy series Spawn. Todd spent his early years in North Haven.

See also
List of neighbourhoods in Calgary

References

External links
North Haven Community Association

Neighbourhoods in Calgary